Argo is an unincorporated community in northwest Crawford County, in the U.S. state of Missouri. The community is on a ridge northwest of the Little Bourbeuse River. The site is located on Missouri Route C about five miles northwest of Bourbon and Interstate 44.

History
A post office called Argo was established in 1849, and discontinued in 1906. The community most likely was named after the mythological ship Argo.

In 1925, Argo had 24 inhabitants.

References

Unincorporated communities in Crawford County, Missouri
Unincorporated communities in Missouri